The UIC Flames men's basketball team represents the University of Illinois at Chicago in Chicago, Illinois, United States. The team competes in the Missouri Valley Conference. From 1994 to 2022, the team competed in the Horizon League. The Flames are currently coached by Luke Yaklich.

Postseason

NCAA tournament results
The Flames have appeared in three NCAA Tournaments, including an at-large selection in 1998. Their combined record is 0–3.

NIT results
The Flames have appeared in one National Invitation Tournament (NIT). Their record is 0–1.

CIT results
The Flames have appeared in the CollegeInsider.com Postseason Tournament (CIT) two times. Their combined record is 4–2.

CBI results
The Flames have appeared in one College Basketball Invitational (CBI). Their record is 2–1.

Yearly records

References

External links